"Let It Go" is a song by American R&B singer Keyshia Cole featuring American rappers Missy Elliott and Lil' Kim. It was written by Cole, Jack Knight, Cainon Lamb, Lil' Kim, and Missy Elliott for her second album Just Like You (2007) and samples "Juicy Fruit" by Mtume, and "Don't Stop the Music" by Yarbrough and Peoples, while also interpolating "Juicy" by The Notorious B.I.G., who also sampled "Juicy Fruit." An uptempo song written by all three artists with Jack Knight, Cainon Lamb and James Mtume and produced by Lamb and Elliott, it marked the first collaboration between any of the three artists with one another.

Released as the album's lead single, it debuted at number 74 on the Billboard Hot 100 on the issue date of July 7, 2007, and peaked at number 7, becoming Cole's third top ten hit single altogether and first top ten Billboard Hot 100 single as a lead artist. It also became Cole's first number-one hit on the R&B/Hip-Hop Songs chart. It was nominated for a Grammy Award for Best Rap/Sung Collaboration at the 50th annual ceremony, held in February 2008. "Let It Go" was ranked 59th on Rolling Stones list of the 100 Best Songs of 2007. The single sold over two million copies in the US and was certified platinum by the Recording Industry Association of America (RIAA).

Background 
"Let It Go" was written and produced by rapper Missy Elliott and originally intended for singer Fantasia Barrino's self-titled second album (2007). A song about female empowerment and failed relationships that talks about "letting go" of a relationship if one partner is not there for the other, and is not interested in showing love or respect, it failed to make the final tracklisting. After Elliott played the song to Cole she decided she wanted to record it for her second album Just like You. On their collaboration, Elliott later: "I tried to hurry up past it cause I felt Keyshia wouldn't want it. She said she wanted to work with me and I really didn't know what kind of direction she wanted to go in. But as soon as the chords came on she was like, 'Wait-wait-wait stop! Stop!' She was like all, who record is that? I was like, well [Fantasia] had too many records on her album so I couldn't take it. And she wanted it."

Rapper 50 Cent disclosed in an interview with radio station Hot 97, that "Let It Go" was also offered to G-Unit artist Olivia who picked "Cherry Pop," another Elliott track instead. Lil' Kim appears on the record to pay homage to Biggie, as the song is similar to his 1994 hit single "Juicy" which also contains excerpts from Mtume's 1983 song "Juicy Fruit." Elliott also produced the official "Let It Go" remix that features vocals by rappers T.I. and  Young Dro instead of Lil' Kim. It was also included on the Just Like You album as the final track. An alternate remix featuring Busta Rhymes and extended verses by Lil' Kim remained unreleased till its Internet leak in 2011. There's a full version of the song that runs 5:15 which has Lil Kim's full verse that leaked initially. This version was not used for the album or video. But it can be found on the digital single of the track as well as on YouTube.

Music video

Cole reunited with director Benny Boom, director of several videos from her The Way It Is era, to produce a visual for "Let It Go." Filming took place at the Manhattan nightspots Guesthouse and Home in New York City on June 22, 2007. Rappers Angie Martinez and Fat Joe make cameo appearances in the video. When asked about the treament of the video, Cole explained in an interview with MTV News that "the concept of the video was you know, I'm chillin' at home, I just want to go out, they want me to go out, so I go out. I go do my thing and have a good time, basically. It's a party concept: This is what you need to do when you hear this song come on at the club. That's what you need to do with this record: Let it go."

Chart performance
Upon its release, "Let It Go" became Cole's highest-charting single as a lead artist. Her only solo top ten hit on the US Billboard Hot 100, it peaked at number 7. "Let It Go" also reached number one the Hot R&B/Hip-Hop Songs chart, becoming Cole's first song to do so, and entered the top three of the Rhythmic Songs chart. Billboard ranked the song 65th on the Billboard Hot 100 year-end chart and twelfth on the Hot R&B/Hip-Hop Songs year-end chart in 2007. On December 6, 2007, "Let It Go" was certified platinum by the Recording Industry Association of America (RIAA).

Track listings

Sample credits
"Let It Go" contains excerpts from "Juicy Fruit" as performed by Mtume.

Notes
  signifies co-producer
  signifies additional producer

Credits and personnel 
Credits adapted from the liner notes of Just like You.

Scott Berger-Felder – assistant engineer
Keyshia Cole – vocals, writer
Melissa Elliott – producer, vocals, writer
Paul Falcone – engineer
Jack Knight – writer
Cainon Lamb – co-producer, writer
Lil' Kim – vocals, writer
Prince Maestro – keys
James Mtume – writer (sample)
Taurian Osborne – keys
Soul Diggaz – DJ scratches

Charts

Weekly charts

Year-end charts

Certifications and sales

See also 
List of number-one R&B singles of 2007 (U.S.)

References 

2007 singles
Keyshia Cole songs
Lil' Kim songs
Missy Elliott songs
Music videos directed by Benny Boom
Songs written by Missy Elliott
Songs written by Keyshia Cole
Songs written by James Mtume
2007 songs
Geffen Records singles
Songs written by Lil' Kim
Songs written by Cainon Lamb